Visser's gecko (Pachydactylus visseri) is a species of lizard in the family Gekkonidae. The species is native to southern Africa.

Etymology
The specific name, visseri, is in honor of South African herpetologist John Duckitt Visser (1938–2012).

Geographic range
P. visseri is found in Namibia and South Africa.

Description
The tail is long, 120% SVL.

Reproduction
P. visseri is oviparous.

References

Further reading
Barts M, Colacicco F (2015). "Die dickfingergeckos des südlichen Afrikas Teil XVIII: Pachydactylus visseri BAUER, LAMB & BRANCH, 2006 ". Sauria 37 (2): 53–57. (in German).
Bauer AM, Lamb T, Branch WR (2006). "A Revision of the Pachydactylus serval and P. weberi Groups (Reptilia: Gekkota: Gekkonidae) of Southern Africa, with the Description of Eight New Species". Proceedings of the California Academy of Sciences, Fourth Series 57 (23): 595–709. (Pachydactylus visseri, new species, pp. 676–679 + Figures 108–111).

Pachydactylus
Reptiles of Namibia
Reptiles of South Africa
Reptiles described in 2006
Taxa named by William Roy Branch